The Greens/European Free Alliance (Greens/EFA) is a political group of the European Parliament composed primarily of green and regionalist political parties.

Formed following the 1999 European elections for the 5th European Parliament, the Greens/EFA group now consists of five distinct European political parties, namely the larger European Green Party (EGP) and part of the European Free Alliance (EFA) and the smaller European Pirate Party (PPEU), Volt Europa (Volt), and part of Animal Politics EU (APEU). The EFA consists of parties representing stateless nations, regionalist and minority political interests. The group has generally limited its membership to progressive parties. These European parties are joined by MEPs from non-aligned national parties, which have included the Dutch Europe Transparent (2004–2009) and the Swedish (2009–2014), German (2014–) and Czech (2019–) Pirate Parties.

Group members

9th European Parliament

8th European Parliament

7th European Parliament

6th European Parliament

Group presidents 
The Greens/EFA group is usually co-chaired by 2 presidents, at least one of them must be a woman.

European Parliament results

References

External links 

 Official website 

Political parties established in 1999
European Parliament party groups
Main
1999 establishments in the European Union